Sudan Airways is the national airline of Sudan, headquartered in Khartoum. Since 2012, the company has been fully owned by the Government of Sudan.

, Sudan Airways had 1,700 employees. The airline has been included in the list of air carriers banned in the European Union .

History
An Air Advisory Board was formed in 1945 to assess on the feasibility of starting air services in the country, recommending to set up an air company with the aid of foreign carriers that would provide their technical and management expertise. Initially, the new airline would restrict its operations to on-demand services. Sudan Airways was formed in February 1946 with the technical assistance of Airwork Limited, and the commercial support of Sudan Railways. 

The first scheduled operations were launched in July the same year, with the first timetable being published in September. Khartoum became Sudan Airways' hub from the very beginning. From there, the carrier started flying four different services all across the Sudanese territory, as well as to Eritrea. The first routes the company flew linked Khartoum with Asmara, Atbara, El Fashir, El Obeid, Geneina, Juba, Kassala, Malakal, and Port Sudan, all of them served by de Havilland Dove aircraft. An Airwork Viking flew the Blackbushe–Khartoum long-haul route. That year, a route to Wadi Halfa was launched. Sudan Railways withdrew from the airline's management in 1949; the government and Airwork continued running the company thereafter.

Kassala and Asmara were removed from the airline list of destinations in 1952. In February that year, a fifth Dove was phased in. There was such a demand for flying that the toilets on the Doves were removed to make room for more seats, with these aircraft even carrying passengers in the cockpit. This prompted the airline to look for newer and bigger airliners, with the Douglas DC-3 and the de Havilland Heron being under consideration. That year, the carrier incorporated the first four DC-3s into the fleet. The boost in capacity allowed the company to carry both passengers and mail, to introduce new regular routes to Cairo and Wad Medani, and to carry out aerial survey tasks for the government. Services to Athens commenced in the mid-1950s. Two more DC-3s were bought in 1956. In 1958, after taking office, the Supreme Council of the Armed Forces decided to expand the carrier's international operations. A seventh DC-3 was incorporated into the fleet that year. Long-haul services started in June 1959 between Khartoum and London via Rome –the so-called "Blue Nile" service– using a Viscount 831 that was acquired new earlier that year in a joint venture with British United Airways. Beirut was added to the destination network in November the same year. Also in 1959, the airline joined IATA.

By , the fleet included seven DC-3s, four Doves, and a Viscount 831. Aimed at replacing the DC-3s and the Doves in domestic and regional routes, the airline acquired three Fokker F27s in October that year; these were delivered in early 1962, with the first of them being deployed on domestic routes, making Sudan Airways the first African airline in operating the type. Also in 1962, two Comet 4Cs were bought in May, intended as a replacement of the Viscount service; Sudan Airways had considered the acquisition of two jets for deployment on the ″Blue Nile″ route since the frequency on the service was increased to twice weekly in 1961. In 1967, the company became a corporation run on a commercial basis; also, three Twin Otters were ordered as a replacement for the DC-3s. The first of these aircraft joined the fleet in 1968; the second aircraft of the type delivered to the company was the  produced by de Havilland Canada.

By , the route network totaled , with international destinations including Aden, Addis Ababa, Asmara, Athens, Beirut, Cairo, Entebbe, Fort Lamy, Jeddah, London, Nairobi and Rome. At this time, the fleet was composed of two Comet 4Cs, three DC-3s, four F-27s and three Twin Otters. The last passenger DC-3 left the fleet in 1971. In 1972, the Comets were put on sale and were replaced by two Boeing 707s leased from British Midland.

By this time, the airline provided scheduled services to Abu Dhabi, Addis Ababa, Al Ain, Amman, Bangui, Cairo, Damascus, Doha, Dongola, Dubai, El Fasher, El Obeid, Eldebba, Geneina, Istanbul, Jeddah, Juba, Kano, Lagos, London, Malakal, Merowe, Muscat, Ndjamena, Niamey, Nyala, Paris, Port Sudan, Riyadh, Sanaa, Sharjah, Tripoli, Wadi Halfa and Wau. In 2007, the Sudanese government privatised the airline, maintaining only a 30% stake of the national carrier. The Kuwaiti private group that owned 49% of the shares since then sold its stake back to the state in 2011.

In the wake of the crash of Flight 109, in  the airline was grounded following an indefinite suspension of its operating certificate by the Sudanese government, despite the fact that it was stated as not being in connection with the accident. This decision was later rolled back, and the company was allowed to resume operations.

In 2017, it was announced that the Sudanese President Omar al Bashir signed several cooperation agreements with King Salman of Saudi Arabia during a visit to Riyadh. Among the agreements was a pledge from the Saudi General Authority of Civil Aviation to restructure SAR22.5 million riyals (US$6 million) worth of debt. In addition, provisions for fleet renewal at Sudan Airways were also made. It was reported Saudi Arabia may equip the Sudan Airways with fourteen aircraft including three B777s, three A320-200s, six Embraer Regional Jets, and two A330-200s.

Following the lifting of American sanctions in 2017, Sudan Airways announced plans to revive its fleet.

EU ban
In late , all Sudan-based airlines were banned by the European Union (EU) from flying into or within the member states. All the subsequent released ban lists included all airlines with an operator's certificate issued in Sudan as banned to operate into the member countries of the EU.

Corporate affairs

Key people
, the CEO position was held by Yasir Timo.

Headquarters
Sudan Airways has its headquarters in Khartoum.

Destinations

, the airline serves six domestic and nine international destinations from its hub in Khartoum.

Fleet

Current

The Sudan Airways fleet consists of the following aircraft (as of February 2023):

Retired

The company has flown the following aircraft throughout its history:

 Airbus A300B4-600R
 Airbus A300-600
 Airbus A300-600F
 Airbus A310-200
 Airbus A310-300
 Antonov An-24T
 Antonov An-24RV
 Antonov An-74TK
 Boeing 707-120B
 Boeing 707-320B
 Boeing 707-320C
 Boeing 720-020
 Boeing 727-200
 Boeing 737-200
 Boeing 737-200C
 Boeing 737-400
 Boeing 737-500
 Boeing 757-200
 C-130H
 Comet 4C
 de Havilland Dove
 DHC-6 Twin Otter
 Douglas C-47B
 Douglas DC-8-30
 Douglas DC-8-60
 DC-9-80
 Fokker F27-200
 Fokker F27-400
 Fokker F27-500
 Fokker F27-600
 Ilyushin Il-18D
 Ilyushin Il-18V
 L-1011-1
 L-1011-500
 McDonnell Douglas DC-10-30
 Viscount 800
 Yak-42D

Accidents and incidents
According to Aviation Safety Network,  Sudan Airways records 21 accidents/incidents, 7 of them leading to fatalities. The worst accident experienced by the company took place in  near Port Sudan, when 117 people lost their lives on an emergency landing. All events included in the list below carried with the hull-loss of the aircraft involved.

See also

Transport in Sudan
List of airlines of Sudan

Notes

References

Bibliography

External links

 
Airlines banned in the European Union
Airlines established in 1947
Airlines of Sudan
Arab Air Carriers Organization members
Government-owned airlines
1947 establishments in Sudan